Maxim Joseph St. Pierre (born April 17, 1980) is a Canadian former professional baseball catcher. He played in Major League Baseball (MLB) for the Detroit Tigers.

Career

Minor Leagues 
Prior to being called up to the Tigers, St. Pierre spent 14 seasons in the minor leagues.  He played in the Tigers minor league system from 1997 to 2010, with the exception of 2007, which was spent in the Milwaukee Brewers system. He signed with the Kansas City Royals before the season, but was traded to the Brewers on March 27 for Ben Hendrickson.

Detroit Tigers
He received his first promotion to the major leagues on September 1, 2010.

The Tigers re-signed St. Pierre to a minor league contract on November 8, 2010. He elected free agency on November 2, 2011.

Boston Red Sox
On January 2, 2012, St. Pierre signed a minor league deal with the Boston Red Sox organization. He was released by the club in Spring Training.

Quebec Capitales
St. Pierre played in 11 contests for the Quebec Capitales of the Canadian American Association of Professional Baseball and became a free agent after the season.

Retirement
St. Pierre is currently the bullpen coach for the Quebec Capitales of the Can-Am League.

References

External links

1980 births
Living people
Baseball people from Quebec
Canadian baseball coaches
Canadian expatriate baseball players in the United States
Detroit Tigers players
Erie SeaWolves players
Gulf Coast Tigers players
Huntsville Stars players
Lakeland Tigers players
Major League Baseball catchers
Major League Baseball players from Canada
Oneonta Tigers players
Québec Capitales players
Sportspeople from Quebec City
Toledo Mud Hens players
West Michigan Whitecaps players
World Baseball Classic players of Canada
2006 World Baseball Classic players